During the mid-1960s, the New York Fifth Avenue Vietnam Peace Parade Committee coordinated anti-war parades which involved perhaps hundreds of organizations.

Leader Norma Becker was a member of the established War Resisters League.
Chairman David Dellinger later became known as one of the Chicago Eight.

Anti–Vietnam War groups
History of New York City